The UK Albums Chart is one of many music charts compiled by the Official Charts Company that calculates the best-selling albums of the week in the United Kingdom. Before 2004, the chart was only based on the sales of physical albums. This list shows albums that peaked in the Top 5 (top 10 from November) of the UK Albums Chart during 1958, as well as albums which peaked in 1957 or 1959 but were in the top 5/10 in 1958. The entry date is when the album appeared in the top 5/10 for the first time (week ending, as published by the Official Charts Company, which is six days after the chart is announced).

Thirty-nine albums were in the top ten this year. Three albums from 1956 and eleven albums from 1958 remained in the top 10 for several weeks at the beginning of the year, while Songs for Swingin' Sellers by Peter Sellers and Time to Celebrate by Russ Conway were both released in 1959 but did not reach their peak until 1960. Five artists scored multiple entries in the top 10 in 1959. were among the artists who achieved their first UK charting top 10 album in 1959.

West Side Story progressed to its peak position of number three in 1962. Frank Sinatra Sings for Only the Lonely by Frank Sinatra, Oh Boy!: Original Television Soundtrack credited to various artists, Pack Up Your Troubles by Russ Conway, Songs by Tom Lehrer by Tom Lehrer and The Student Prince/The Great Caruso by Mario Lanza were the albums from 1958 to reach their peak in 1959.

The 1958 Christmas number-one album, South Pacific: Original Soundtrack credited to Various artists, remained at number one for the duration of 1959.

Background

Multiple entries
Thirty-nine albums charted in the top 10 in 1959, with twenty-eight albums reaching their peak this year.

Five artists scored multiple entries in the top 10 in 1959. Frank Sinatra secured the record for most hit albums in 1959 with five entries. Peter Sellers' three albums and Duane Eddy's two entries were all released this year.

Chart debuts
The following table (collapsed on desktop site) does not include does not include acts who had previously charted as part of a group and secured their first top 10 solo album, or featured appearances on compilations or other artists recordings.

Soundtrack albums
Cast recordings from various films and musicals made the top 5/10 this year. These included Carousel, The Duke Wore Jeans, My Fair Lady, The Pajama Game, Pal Joey and South Pacific.

Top-ten albums
Key

Entries by artist
The following table shows artists who achieved two or more 10 entries in 1959, including albums that reached their peak in 1958 and 1960. The figures only include main artists, with featured artists and appearances on compilation albums not counted individually for each artist. The total number of weeks an artist spent in the top ten in 1959 is also shown.

Notes

 Recordings credited to Original Soundtrack by the Official Charts Company but all had different artists as featured performers.
 Elvis Rock 'N' Roll originally peaked at number-one upon its initial release in 1956.
 Figure includes album that peaked in 1958.
 Figure includes album that peak in 1960.
 Songs for Swingin' Sellers reached its peak of number three on 16 January 1960 (week ending).

See also
1959 in British music
List of number-one albums from the 1950s (UK)

References
General

Specific

External links
1959 album chart archive at the Official Charts Company (click on relevant week)

United Kingdom top 10 albums
Top 10 albums
1959